Established in 1910, the Aurelian Honor Society ("Aurelian") is the fifth oldest landed secret society at Yale University in New Haven, Connecticut. It is a member of the Ancient Eight, which also includes Skull and Bones, Scroll and Key, and Wolf's Head. In addition, Aurelian is part of a four-society "Consortium" with Manuscript Society, Book and Snake, and Berzelius.

Contemporary membership is based on an election process coordinated by the incumbent delegation. Aurelian selects sixteen prominent members of the Junior class to join the Society annually.

Founding mission 
At the beginning of the 20th century, Yale University had two separate undergraduate colleges, each with separate facilities, administrations, and student bodies. One of these, the Sheffield Scientific School, suffered from student divisiveness due to an active Greek system that separated fraternities from each other, and those who were not in fraternities from those who were. In the spring of 1910, Lindell T. Bates and Loomis Havemeyer, recognizing the fragmentation of the student body and lack of unified leadership, founded the Aurelian Honor Society for seniors "who would not labor under unnecessary handicaps which separated the existing clubs from the student body". Membership in this Society would be offered to outstanding "Sheff" students of good scholarship and extracurricular achievement. In addition, the Society was to elect three honorary members annually. The purpose of this non-secret organization was to formulate mature undergraduate opinion on those matters affecting the vital interests of the Sheffield Scientific School, both internally and in its relations with the rest of the University.

Name and emblem 
The name was chosen in honor of the Roman Emperor Marcus Aurelius, whose career and philosophy represented those ideas for which the organization wished to strive.

These ideals are symbolized by the Society's emblem: a seven-pointed star surrounded by a wreath. The wreath represents a reward of merit, and the star stands for a single body (originally seven members) radiating light in the seven principal lines of college activity—Scientific, Athletic, Literary, Oratorical, Executive, Scholarship, and Religious.

History 
The Constitution of the society reads: "The object of this Society is to encourage and promote high character, gentlemanly conduct and the molding of one's career to a life to the community, and to bring the active members into contact with the honorary members who shall have been selected with the view that their careers shall be a source of inspiration". 
 
The first official meeting was held on June 6, 1910. The minutes from this meeting and subsequent meetings are collected in books in The Rooms, the Society's headquarters. At each meeting, a paper was read by a member on issues of undergraduate life. These papers have been collected and preserved by the Society's Historian and can now be found locked in a large safe that safeguards other treasures of the organization.  
 
Besides discussing issues of the University, Aurelian has, since its inception, overseen a variety of important philanthropic activities in support of the University: a scholarship fund (in place since 1953 administered by the financial aid office), an undergraduate science contest, the Chester Harding Plimpton award ($100 in gold and the bas-relief medal, the original medal once hung on the wall in The Rooms), a public lecture series, and the prep-school cup award (predecessor to the present book awards). In 1935, the Society voted to give the University $250 to make a film of "Life at Yale" to be sent to alumni meetings throughout the country. The Society also enjoyed many social activities: supper parties in The Rooms, graduate teas after the big games in the fall, a luncheon on Class Day for graduates and their families and occasional theater and athletic events. It holds one of the largest endowments amongst societies at Yale. For many years, the New York alumni invited the Aurelian undergraduates to the Yale Club for a reception. In 2010, the Society hosted its 100th Anniversary at the Yale Club of New York.

After the unification of Yale College and the Sheffield Scientific School, and through the tumultuous era of the 1960s, the Aurelian Honor Society's role in University governance declined. Nevertheless, Aurelian continued to be a supra-senior society, drawing its membership from throughout the University and other societies. Largely due to the sponsorship of Aurelian alumnus Loomis Havemeyer (author of the history of the Society, and whose photo hangs in the main room), Aurelian continued to meet for Tuesday lunches with faculty and honorary members. When Yale went co-ed, Aurelian followed suit, making it one of the few societies to do so at their first opportunity. In 1981, with the help of Dick Shank, then Registrar of Yale College and a successor of Loomis Havemeyer, Aurelian was revived after a period of a few years in the late 1970s when all societies and fraternities were in decline.   In 2009, the delegation modified the constitution, officially declaring itself a Senior Society and thereby formally adopting the practices of those societies such as mutual exclusivity from other societies, conducting student biographies, and participating in the tap process. The Society still seeks to attract members from all walks of student life and maintains contact with the faculty. In this way, Aurelian still maintains the leadership role on which it was founded, emphasizing a sense of history and inquisitiveness. This legacy persists in its annual speakers program and monthly lunches with members of the faculty and administration. Past guests of the Society include Four Star American General Stanley A. McChrystal and American politician Howard Dean.

Yale University President Peter Salovey, Yale University Dean Marvin Chun, and Robert A. Lovett Professor of Military and Naval History John Lewis Gaddis are among the honorary members who make annual visits to the Aurelian delegation.

Philanthropy 
Aurelian’s history has been defined by its history of service to Yale and to the broader community.

Today, The Aurelian Honor Society Robert H. O’Connor Scholarship is awarded each year to a Yale senior. The Aurelian Honor Society Book Prize is given annually at secondary schools across the country to students those schools consider exemplary. In addition, The Society supports a participating student at the Yale Summer Bioethics Institute through the Nuland Stipend. Most recently, Aurelian has associated itself with the Yale Alumni Non-Profit Alliance (YANA). Some delegations and many delegates have been active volunteers through Dwight Hall and other service organizations.

In 1953, Loomis Havemeyer and fellow Trustees established the Aurelian Honor Society, Inc. as a charitable foundation (501c3) to preserve and further the established principles of the Honor Society and, through stewardship of donated funds, provide a university scholarship, academic prizes in Yale’s name and support for the undergraduate society of the same name.

Membership 
Contemporary membership is based on an election process coordinated by the incumbent delegation. Aurelian selects sixteen prominent members of the Junior class to join the Society annually.  Editors of publications such as The Yale Herald, varsity athletics captains, and other student leaders are typically well represented among Aurelian's ranks.

Membership in Aurelian originally did not preclude membership in a senior society but rather supplemented it, bringing together the best people from various fields to promote the high ideals in service to the University. A quote from the Yale Daily News of April 29, 1933, read: "The Aurelian Honor Society aims to promote contact and communication between members, to exert an organized force for cooperation with the administration and helpfully to consider problems affecting the University." At the 25th anniversary of Aurelian, the president of Yale said that the Society had reached a foremost position at Yale through its years of unceasing work to help solve administrative, educational, and social problems. In recognition, the University gave Aurelian its own luxurious quarters when "The Rooms" were constructed in 1932.

As of the fall of 2017, Aurelian members are provided membership to the Elm City Club, which consists of the Quinnipiack Club and the Graduate Club. This includes exclusive access to The Rooms in the Quinnipiack Club, renovated and used by the society alone.

In addition, Aurelian is part of a four-society "Consortium" with Manuscript Society, Book and Snake and Berzelius. The societies invite each other to their major social events each year in their respective spaces, providing opportunities for inter-society interaction.

Notable alumni

See also
List of Yale University student organizations
Collegiate secret societies in North America

References 

Honor societies
Student organizations established in 1910
Secret societies at Yale
1910 establishments in Connecticut